The 2023 Billie Jean King Cup will be the 60th edition of the Billie Jean King Cup, a tournament between national teams in women's tennis.

Billie Jean King Cup Finals

Date: 7–12 November 2023 
Venue: TBA 
Surface: Hard indoor

12 nations take part in the Finals. The qualification is as follows:
 2 finalists of the  2022 Finals (Australia and Switzerland)
 1 host nation or wild card
 9 winners of the 2023 qualifying round

Participating teams

Qualifying round

Date: 14–15 April 2023

Eighteen teams will play for nine spots in the Finals, in series decided on a home and away basis.

These eighteen teams are:
 10 teams ranked 3rd–12th in the 2022 Finals
 8 winning teams from the 2022 play-offs

The nine winning teams from the qualifying round will play at the Finals and the nine losing teams will play at the 2023 play-offs.

#: Nations Ranking as of 16 November 2022.

Qualified teams

Seeded teams
  (#3)
  (#4)
  (#5)
  (#6)
  (#7)
  (#8)
  (#9)
  (#10)
  (#12)

Unseeded teams
  (#13)
  (#14)
  (#15)
  (#16)
  (#17)
  (#20)
  (#22)
  (#30)
  (#34)

Billie Jean King Cup play-offs

Date: 11–12 November 2023

Sixteen teams played for eight spots in the 2024 qualifying round, in series decided on a home and away basis.

These sixteen teams were:
 9 losing teams from qualifying round, in April 2023
 7 winning teams from their Group I zone.

Americas Zone

Group I 
Date: TBC 
Venue: TBC

Participating teams

Group II 
Date: TBC 
Venue: TBC

Participating teams

Group III 
Date: TBC 
Venue: TBC

Participating teams

Inactive teams

Asia/Oceania Zone

Group I 
Date: 10—15 April 
Venue: Tashkent, Uzbekistan

Participating teams

Group II 
Date: TBC 
Venue: TBC

Participating teams

Group III 
Date: TBC 
Venue: TBC

Participating teams

Inactive teams

Europe/Africa Zone

Group I 
Date: 10-15 April 2023

Venue: Megasaray Tennis Academy, Antalya, Turkey (clay)

Participating teams

Group II 
Date: 10-15 April 2023 

Venue: Jamor Sports Complex, Oeiras, Portugal (clay, outdoors)

Participating teams

 (WD)

Group III Europe
Date: TBC 
Venue: TBC

Participating teams

Group III Africa
Date: TBC 
Venue: TBC

Participating teams

Group IV Africa
Date: TBC 
Venue: TBC

Participating teams

 
 

 

Inactive Teams

References

External links
Official website

 
Billie Jean King Cup
Billie Jean King Cups by year